Drew O'Connor (born June 9, 1998) is an American professional ice hockey winger currently playing for the  Pittsburgh Penguins of the National Hockey League (NHL).

Early life
O'Connor was born to parents Shawn and Meagan O'Connor and grew up alongside a brother Jack and two sisters, Erin and McKenna.

Playing career
O'Connor played for the Dartmouth Big Green at Dartmouth College, in Hanover, New Hampshire. During his freshman season, O'Connor recorded seventeen goals and nine assists for twenty-six points in thirty-four games. Following an outstanding freshman season, he finished the 2019–20 season with twenty-one goals and twelve assists for thirty-three points in thirty-one games, earning him Ivy League Co-Player of the year. On March 10, 2020, O'Connor was signed as an undrafted free agent by the Pittsburgh Penguins to a two-year, entry-level contract.

O'Connor made his NHL debut against the Boston Bruins on January 26, 2021, registering an assist on the Penguins' first goal of the night.

On October 16, 2021, O’Connor scored his first NHL goal in a 5–2 win over the Chicago Blackhawks.

Career statistics

Awards and honours

References

External links 
 

1998 births
Living people
American men's ice hockey left wingers
Dartmouth Big Green men's ice hockey players
Delbarton School alumni
Ice hockey players from New Jersey
Manglerud Star Ishockey players
Sportspeople from Morris County, New Jersey
Pittsburgh Penguins players
Undrafted National Hockey League players
Wilkes-Barre/Scranton Penguins players